Anaridis Rodriguez-Starnino is an American journalist. She currently anchors and reports for the CBS owned-and-operated WBZ-TV in Boston. The journalist also worked for The Weather Channel. She is the former news anchor on America's Morning Headquarters.

Career
During her time at Emerson College, Rodriguez contributed articles to The Boston Globe's hyper-local website "YourTown."  Her college work garnered multiple Associated Press awards.  Upon graduating in 2011, Rodriguez was hired as an anchor/reporter for WWLP-TV ; an NBC  affiliate in western Massachusetts. Aside from her daily beat as a weekday reporter and weekend anchor, she covered the aftermath of a historic tornado and the Boston Marathon bombings.  In February 2014, she was hired by The Weather Channel as a news anchor for the network's flagship morning show, America's Morning Headquarters. On February 24, 2017 she announced she is leaving the Channel to spend more time with her family.
Rodriguez joined CBS Boston as an anchor/reporter in April 2017.

Early life and education
Rodriguez was born in the Dominican Republic and immigrated to the United States at age 12 with her family.

She has a Master's degree in journalism from Emerson College and a Bachelor's degree in communications and Spanish at Rhode Island College.

Personal life
Rodriguez married Jesse J. Starnino on October 6, 2012.  They have one child, a son.

See also
America's Morning Headquarters
List of personalities on The Weather Channel

References

American television news anchors
Living people
The Weather Channel people
Rhode Island College alumni
Emerson College alumni
Place of birth missing (living people)
Year of birth missing (living people)
Dominican Republic emigrants to the United States
American women television journalists
21st-century American women